Kfar Sir  (كفرصير)   is a village  just north of the Litani River, in the Nabatieh District in southern Lebanon.

History
In  the 1596 tax records, it was named as a village,  Kafr Tir, in the Ottoman nahiya (subdistrict) of  Sagif   under the liwa' (district) of Safad, with a population of  58 households and 5 bachelors, all Muslim. The villagers paid a fixed  tax-rate of 25 %  on  agricultural products, such as wheat, barley, olive trees, goats and beehives, in addition to  "occasional revenues" and a press for olive oil or grape syrup; a total of 6,231  akçe.

References

Bibliography

External links
 Kfar Sir, Localiban

Populated places in Nabatieh District